Vikash Rao Dhorasoo (born 10 October 1973) is a former French professional footballer of Indo-Mauritian descent who played as a midfielder.

Dhorasoo spent most of his career with Lyon, winning Ligue 1 twice in 2003 and 2004, and also had a loan at Bordeaux and a spell at Paris Saint-Germain, who dismissed him in October 2006. Abroad, he had one year at Italy's AC Milan where he reached the 2005 UEFA Champions League Final, and a spell at Livorno where he did not play.

Internationally, Dhorasoo earned 18 caps and scored once for France from 1999 to 2006. He was part of their team that came runners-up at the 2006 FIFA World Cup.

Club career

Early career
Born in Harfleur near Le Havre in Normandy, Dhorasoo began his football career with Le Havre AC, where he made his debut in a 0–0 draw with AS Saint-Etienne in August 1993. After five years at Le Havre, he went on to play for Olympique Lyonnais in 1998.

He had a brief spell at league rivals FC Girondins de Bordeaux from 2001 to 2002. He won two French Ligue 1 championships with Lyon in 2003 and 2004.

In April 2004, Dhorasoo agreed to move abroad to play for Italian club AC Milan, on a two-year deal. He was an unused substitute in the 2005 UEFA Champions League Final, when Liverpool beat A.C. Milan on penalties, but won a runners-up medal.

Paris Saint-Germain

Dhorasoo moved back to France in 2005, signing for Paris Saint-Germain (PSG). He was part of the PSG squad that won the 2006 Coupe de France, as he scored a 25-yard shot in the final and secured the victory against fierce rivals Marseille.

In September 2006, he criticised manager Guy Lacombe in an interview with L'Equipe, and a month later his contract with PSG was terminated, being the first player to be sacked from a French club since  the Professional Footballers Charter was set up in 1973. The reasons listed for dismissal were "His refusal to play for the reserves, his lack of loyalty, also his insubordination, disobedience and his permanent air of provocation".

Livorno
On 3 July 2007, Livorno announced to have signed Dhorasoo with a statement on their official website. However, Livorno rescinded his contract in October of the same year due to differences with the club, before having played.

International career

While at Lyon, Dhorasoo made his debut for the France national team in a goalless draw against Ukraine on 27 March 1999. He played another national team match in June 1999, before his national team career went into a five-year hiatus.

Dhorasoo was called up for the France national team for the 2006 FIFA World Cup qualification in September 2004, and he represented the country at the 2006 FIFA World Cup in Germany. After the World Cup, Dhorasoo publicly revealed the time spent in the French squad during the month-long tournament, through a documentary, much to the anger of France national team manager Raymond Domenech and the French Football Federation. Dhorasoo was warned against publishing the documentary. He retired from the France national team, saying "I am not interested in playing for Les Bleus any more. It's over."

Dhorasoo made 18 national team appearances between 1999 and 2006, scoring a single goal in a 4–0 home win over Cyprus on 12 October 2005, ensuring a place at the 2006 World Cup.

International goals

Personal life
Dhorasoo is of Mauritian origin. His ancestors were from India who migrated to Mauritius. Vikash's parents and siblings moved to France where Vikash was born as the fourth child. He began university studies in economics before committing to professional football.

After his dismissal from PSG in 2006, Dhorasoo became a professional poker player for Winamax. He quit the game in September 2011 after a defeat at the Partouche Poker Tour in Cannes. He earned $527,453 in his poker career, and as of November 2020 is ranked 142nd on France's all-time winners.

Dhorasoo's favorite music group is Belle and Sebastian and his favorite author is Jonathan Coe.

Dhorasoo is married and father of two daughters, born in 2003 and 2005.

He has spoken out against bigotry and in 2003 he started actively supporting Paris Foot Gay, a football club which combats homophobia and other discrimination in the sport.

Dhorasoo also works actively to fight poverty in countries such as India and has established several programs for it.

Coaching career
In July 2009, he became chairman of French football club L'Entente SSG.

Honours
Lyon
Ligue 1: 2002–03, 2003–04
Coupe de la Ligue: 2000–01
Trophée des Champions: 2002, 2003

Bordeaux
Coupe de la Ligue: 2001–02

AC Milan
UEFA Champions League:runner up 2004-05
Supercoppa Italiana: 2004

Paris Saint-Germain
Coupe de France: 2005–06

France
FIFA World Cup runner-up: 2006

References

External links

PSG profile 
Blog 

1973 births
Living people
People from Harfleur
Sportspeople from Seine-Maritime
Footballers from Normandy
French footballers
Association football midfielders
Le Havre AC players
Olympique Lyonnais players
FC Girondins de Bordeaux players
A.C. Milan players
Paris Saint-Germain F.C. players
U.S. Livorno 1915 players
Ligue 1 players
Serie A players
France under-21 international footballers
France international footballers
2006 FIFA World Cup players
Olympic footballers of France
Footballers at the 1996 Summer Olympics
French expatriate footballers
Expatriate footballers in Italy
French expatriate sportspeople in Italy
French poker players
French people of Indian descent
French people of Mauritian descent